Jonas Anders Vilhelm Junland (born November 15, 1987) is a Swedish professional ice hockey defenceman who is currently playing for Linköping HC of the Swedish Hockey League (SHL).

Playing career
Junland was drafted 64th overall in the 2006 NHL Entry Draft by the St. Louis Blues. Junland played junior with Linköpings HC before making his professional debut in the Elitserien in the 2005–06 season.

On June 1, 2007, Junland signed a three-year entry level contract with the Blues. In his first North American season in 2008–09 he was assigned to the Blues AHL affiliate, the Peoria Rivermen and was named to the Planet USA All-Star Team at the AHL All-Star Game. He made his NHL debut on December 18, 2008 against the Washington Capitals in a 4-2 defeat. In the 2009–10 season, Junland was again named an AHL All-Star with the Rivermen. He recorded his first NHL points, both assists, in a 6-3 victory over the Anaheim Ducks on April 9, 2010.

Although still holding NHL aspirations, on April 29, 2010, Junland signed a one-year contract to return to the Elitserien with Färjestads BK.

After the beginning of the 2012–13 season, Junland was granted a release by Barys Astana of the Kontinental Hockey League and immediately joined Finnish club, Lahti Pelicans of the SM-liiga, for the remainder of the year on October 4, 2012. In 2013, he returned to his hometown team Linköpings HC, where he spent the following three seasons.

On March 5, 2016, he signed a two-year contract with Lausanne HC of the NLA. He received NLA Regular Season Defenceman of the Year honors in 2016–17. Junland's final years in Lausanne were awful; he struggled to keep up with the pace of the NL and ended up being a healthy scratch even though the team had only 4 import players on the roster. On January 13, 2020, Lausanne released Junland from his contract. He later returned to his original Swedish club, Linköping HC.

Career statistics

Regular season and playoffs

International

References

External links

 

1987 births
Barys Nur-Sultan players
Färjestad BK players
IK Oskarshamn players
Lahti Pelicans players
Lausanne HC players
Linköping HC players
Living people
Sportspeople from Linköping
Peoria Rivermen (AHL) players
St. Louis Blues draft picks
St. Louis Blues players
Swedish expatriate ice hockey players in the United States
Swedish ice hockey defencemen
Sportspeople from Östergötland County